Sir Brandon Charles Gough DL (8 October 1937 – 25 April 2012 ) was a British businessman, and Chancellor of the University of East Anglia.

Charles Brandon Gough was educated at Douai School and Jesus College, Cambridge, where he read natural sciences and law. He held chairmanships of Yorkshire Water, Coopers & Lybrand and De La Rue plc, and was chairman of the Higher Education Funding Council for England. He was knighted in 2002.

References

1937 births
2012 deaths
British businesspeople
Knights Bachelor
Businesspeople awarded knighthoods
People educated at Douai School
Alumni of Jesus College, Cambridge
Chancellors of the University of East Anglia
Deputy Lieutenants of Kent
20th-century British businesspeople